Sacomar is an urban district in southern Angola, part of city of the Moçâmedes.

Transport 

It is the location of marshalling yards associated with the nearby port of Moçâmedes, serving as a connection between the port and the passenger and cargo railway station of the Moçâmedes Railway.

See also 

 Railway stations in Angola
 Transport in Angola

References 

Populated places in Angola